The September 11 attacks in the United States in 2001 were carried out by 19 hijackers of the militant Islamist terrorist organization al-Qaeda. In the 1990s,  al-Qaeda leader Osama bin Laden declared a holy war against the United States, and issued two fatāwā in 1996 and 1998. In these fatāwā, bin Laden sharply criticized the financial contributions of the American government to the Saudi royal family as well as American military intervention in the Arab world.

These motivations were published in bin Laden's November 2002 "Letter to America",  in which he said that al-Qaeda's motives for the attacks included Western support for attacking Muslims in Somalia, supporting Russian atrocities against Muslims in Chechnya, supporting the Indian oppression against Muslims in Kashmir, condoning the 1982 massacres in Lebanon, the presence of US troops in Saudi Arabia, US support of Israel, and sanctions against Iraq.

Following the attacks, the U.S. government took the position, as often repeated by the Bush Administration, that terrorists attacked the United States because "they hate us for our freedoms". President George W. Bush said in a speech to Congress nine days after the attacks that "They hate what we see right here in this chamber — a democratically elected government. Their leaders are self-appointed. They hate our freedoms — our freedom of religion, our freedom of speech, our freedom to vote and assemble and disagree with each other."

Sources

Before the attacks, Al-Qaeda issued proclamations that provide insight into the motivations for the attacks: one was the fatwā of August 1996, and a second was a shorter fatwā in February 1998. Both documents appeared initially in the Arabic-language London newspaper Al-Quds Al-Arabi. Bin Laden's 1998 fatwā stated: "We -- with God's help -- call on every Muslim who believes in God and wishes to be rewarded to comply with God's order to kill the Americans and plunder their money wherever and whenever they find it. We also call on Muslim ulema, leaders, youths, and soldiers to launch the raid on Satan's U.S. troops and the devil's supporters allying with them, and to displace those who are behind them so that they may learn a lesson." The fatwā also complains against the presence of the US in Saudi Arabia and support for Israel. 

After the attacks, bin Laden and Ayman al-Zawahiri published dozens of video tapes and audio tapes, many describing the motivations for the attacks. Two particularly important publications were bin Laden's 2002 "Letter to America", and a 2004 video tape by bin Laden. In addition to direct pronouncements by bin Laden and Al-Qaeda, numerous political analysts have postulated motivations for the attacks.

Stated motives

Support of Israel by United States

In his November 2002 "Letter to America", bin Laden described the United States' support of Israel as a motivation:

The expansion of Israel is one of the greatest crimes, and you are the leaders of its criminals. And of course there is no need to explain and prove the degree of American support for Israel. The creation of Israel is a crime which must be erased. Each and every person whose hands have become polluted in the contribution towards this crime must pay its price, and pay for it heavily.

In 2004 and 2010, bin Laden again repeated the connection between the September 11 attacks and the support of Israel by the United States. Support of Israel was also mentioned before the attack in the 1998 Al-Qaeda fatwā:

[T]he aim [of the United States] is also to serve the Jews' (Zionists) petty state and divert attention from its occupation of Jerusalem and murder of Muslims there. The best proof of this is their eagerness to destroy Iraq, the strongest neighboring Arab state, and their endeavor to fragment all the states of the region such as Iraq, Saudi Arabia, Egypt, and Sudan into paper statelets and through their disunion and weakness to guarantee Israel's survival and the continuation of the brutal crusade occupation of the Peninsula.

American immorality
In the above-mentioned 2002 "Letter To America", bin Laden laments the immoral behavior that has become the norm in the United States as a motivating factor in his decision to launch the attacks:

The second thing we call you to, is to stop your oppression, lies, immorality and debauchery that has spread among you. (a) We call you to be a people of manners, principles, honour, and purity; to reject the immoral acts of fornication, homosexuality, intoxicants, gambling, and trading with interest.

Sanctions imposed against Iraq

On 6 August 1990, after the Iraqi invasion of Kuwait, the UN Security Council adopted Resolution 661, which imposed economic sanctions on Iraq, providing for a full trade embargo, excluding medical supplies, food, and other items of humanitarian necessity (these to be determined by the Security Council sanctions committee). After the end of the Gulf War and after the Iraqi withdrawal from Kuwait, the sanctions were linked to removal of weapons of mass destruction by Resolution 687.

In the 1998 fatwa, Al Qaeda identified the Iraq sanctions as a reason to kill Americans:

despite the great devastation inflicted on the Iraqi people by the crusader-Zionist alliance, and despite the huge number of those killed, which has exceeded 1 million ... despite all this, the Americans are once again trying to repeat the horrific massacres, as though they are not content with the protracted blockade imposed after the ferocious war or the fragmentation and devastation. ... On that basis, and in compliance with Allah's order, we issue the following fatwa to all Muslims: The ruling to kill the Americans and their allies—civilians and military—is an individual duty for every Muslim ...cf. 

In the 2004 Osama bin Laden video, bin Laden calls the sanctions "the greatest mass slaughter of children mankind has ever known".

Presence of US military in Saudi Arabia

After the 1991 Gulf war, the US maintained a presence of 5,000 troops stationed in Saudi Arabia. One of the responsibilities of that force was Operation Southern Watch, which enforced the no-fly zones over southern Iraq set up after 1991, and the country's oil exports through the shipping lanes of the Persian Gulf are protected by the US Fifth Fleet, based in Bahrain.

Since Saudi Arabia houses the holiest sites in Islam (Mecca and Medina), many Muslims were upset at the permanent military presence.
The continued presence of US troops after the Gulf War in Saudi Arabia was one of the stated motivations behind the September 11th attacks and the Khobar Towers bombing. Further, the date chosen for the 1998 United States embassy bombings (August 7) was eight years to the day that American troops were sent to Saudi Arabia. bin Laden interpreted Muhammad as banning the "permanent presence of infidels in Arabia".

In 1996, bin Laden issued a fatwa calling for American troops to get out of Saudi Arabia. In the 1998 fatwa, Al-Qaeda wrote: "for over seven years the United States has been occupying the lands of Islam in the holiest of places, the Arabian Peninsula, plundering its riches, dictating to its rulers, humiliating its people, terrorizing its neighbors, and turning its bases in the Peninsula into a spearhead through which to fight the neighboring Muslim peoples." In the December 1999 interview with Rahimullah Yusufzai, bin Laden said he felt that Americans were "too near to Mecca" and considered this a provocation to the entire Muslim world.

Conflict in Somalia, Chechnya, Kashmir, Lebanon and the Philippines 
Clause 1B and 4 of Osama bin Laden's manifesto state that:"You attacked us in Somalia; you supported the Russian atrocities against us in Chechnya, the Indian oppression against us in Kashmir, and the Jewish aggression against us in Lebanon. . .

We also advise you to stop supporting Israel, and to end your support of the Indians in Kashmir, the Russians against the Chechens and to also cease supporting the Manila Government against the Muslims in Southern Philippines."

Inferred motives
Political analysts have inferred some motives for the attacks that were not explicitly stated by Al-Qaeda, such as globalization and a desire to provoke the United States.

Elliot Neaman stated that the connections Walt and Mearsheimer and others, including many German intellectuals, make between 9/11 and Israel are ahistorical. He argues that the Palestinians themselves have often pointed to their betrayal by one Arab leader after another since the founding of the state of Israel, and further that bin Laden is no exception, as he never showed any concern for the Palestinian cause until he came under the influence of Ayman Al-Zawahiri and decided to use the Palestinians as a means to gain the favor of militant Muslims. Al-Qaeda and Hamas continue to have a fraught relationship, and have been argued to have different goals in regard to the Israeli–Palestinian conflict.

Religious motivation
Daniel Benjamin and Steven Simon, in their book, The Age of Sacred Terror, argue that the 9/11 terrorist attacks are purely religious. They are seen as "a sacrament ... intended to restore to the universe a moral order that had been corrupted by the enemies of Islam." It is neither political nor strategic but an "act of redemption" meant to "humiliate and slaughter those who defied the hegemony of God."

Raymond Ibrahim, as a researcher at the Library of Congress, found a significant difference between Al Qaeda's messages in English directed to a Western audience and al Qaeda's Arab messages and documents directed to an Islamic audience. The Western-directed messages listed grievances as grounds for retaliation employing the "language of 'reciprocity.'" Literature for Islamic audiences contained theological motivations bereft of references to the acts of Western nations.

Globalization
Bernard Lewis is the best-known exponent of the idea of the "humiliation" of the Islamic world through globalization. In the 2004 book The Crisis of Islam: Holy War and Unholy Terror, he argues animosity toward the West is best understood with the decline of the once powerful Ottoman Empire, compounded by the import of western ideas, as seen in Arab socialism, Arab liberalism and Arab secularism.

During the past three centuries, the Islamic world has lost its dominance and its leadership, and has fallen behind both the modern West and the rapidly modernizing Orient. This widening gap poses increasingly acute problems, both practical and emotional, for which the rulers, thinkers, and rebels of Islam have not yet found effective answers.

In an essay titled "The spirit of terrorism", Jean Baudrillard described 9/11 as the first global event that "questions the very process of globalization".

Provocation of war with the United States

Some Middle East scholars—such as Michael Scott Doran and Peter Bergen—have argued that 9/11 was a strategic way to provoke America into a war that incites a pan-Islamist revolution. Doran argued that the attacks are best understood as being part of a religious conflict within the Muslim world. In an essay, Doran argued that bin Laden's followers "consider themselves an island of true believers surrounded by a sea of iniquity". Doran further argued that bin Laden hoped that US retaliation would unite the faithful against the West, sparking revolutions in Arab nations and elsewhere, and that the Osama bin Laden videos were attempting to provoke a visceral reaction in the Middle East aimed at a violent reaction by Muslim citizens to increased US involvement in their region.

Bergen argued that the attacks were part of a plan to cause the United States to increase its military and cultural presence in the Middle East, thereby forcing Muslims to confront the idea of a non-Muslim government and establish conservative Islamic governments in the region.

U.S. President George W. Bush did in fact declare a War on Terror, which resulted in the temporary loss of control of Afghanistan by the Al-Qaeda-allied Taliban after fighting for two decades.  Despite criticism that the Iraqi government had no involvement with the September 11 attacks, Bush declared the 2003 invasion of Iraq to be part of the War on Terror. The resulting backlash and instability enabled the rise of Islamic State of Iraq and the Levant and the temporary creation of an Islamic caliphate holding territory in Iraq and Syria, until ISIL lost its territory through military defeats.

Research on suicide terrorism
Robert Pape identified 315 incidents, all but 14 of which they classified as part of 18 different campaigns. These 18 shared two elements and all but one shared a third: 1) A foreign occupation; 2) by a democracy; 3) of a different religion. Mia Bloom interviewed relatives and acquaintances of suicide terrorists. Her conclusions largely support Pape's, suggesting that it is much more difficult to get people to volunteer for a suicide mission without foreign occupation.

See also
 Planning of the September 11 attacks

References

September 11 attacks
Causes of events